"We Got Love" is a dance/pop song by Australian dance duo, Disco Montego. It was released in May 2001 and was the first release by Disco Montego since changing their name from Kaylan.

The song contains a sample of  "Heartache No.9" by Delegation.

It was released as the first single from their studio album, Disco Montego (2002). "We Got Love" peaked at number 98 on the ARIA Chart and number 6 on the Australian Club Chart.

Track listing
Australian CD single
 "We Got Love" (Radio Edit) - 3:55
 "We Got Love" (Extended Mix) - 5:43
 "We Got Love" (Studio 347 Remix) - 8:05
 "We Got Love" (Hayden's Remix) - 7:33

12" 
A.1	We Got Love (Extended Mix) - 5:44
A.2	We Got Love (Radio Edit) - 3:56
B.1	We Got Love (Studio 347 Remix) - 8:08

Charts

References

2001 singles
Disco Montego songs
2001 songs